Baeckea grandis is a species of flowering plant in the family Myrtaceae and is endemic to the south-west of Western Australia. Found on sand-plains and hills in the Mid West and northern Wheatbelt regions of Western Australia, it grows in sandy and lateritic soils.

The species was first formally described by the botanist Ernst Georg Pritzel in 1904 in Engler's journal Botanische Jahrbücher für Systematik, Pflanzengeschichte und Pflanzengeographie in an article by Pritzel and Ludwig Diels entitled Fragmenta Phytographiae Australiae occidentalis. The specific epithet (grandis) means "great, large or tall".

See also
List of Baeckea species

References

Flora of Western Australia
grandis
Plants described in 1904
Taxa named by Ernst Pritzel